Cochapata or Qochapata (possibly from Quechua qucha lake, pata elevated place, riverbank, shore) is an archaeological site in Peru. It is located in the district of Huayopata, La Convención Province, Cusco.

See also 
 Allpamayu
 Inka Tampu
Lucumayo River
Huamanmarca
Veronica

References 

Archaeological sites in Peru
Archaeological sites in Cusco Region